Pablo Morgado Blanco (born 31 May 1989) is a Spanish professional footballer who plays for spanish club La Nucía as a forward.

Club career
Born in Valencia, Morgado graduated from the youth academy of Valencia CF and made his senior debut with the reserve team in the 2008–09 season, in the Segunda División B. Following a loan deal with CF La Nucía, he joined CD Mirandés on a temporary basis on 1 February 2010 for the remainder of the 2009–10 season.

On 22 July 2011, Morgado signed for Huracán Valencia CF. On 28 August, he scored his first goal for the club in a 1–0 victory over RCD Mallorca B.

On 8 July 2014, Morgado joined CE L'Hospitalet. He played regularly for the club, contributing with three goals in 31 matches. On 27 July 2015, he switched to CF Badalona in the same tier. He signed for Mérida AD on 14 July 2016. However, after deemed surplus to their requirements, he switched to FC Jumilla on 31 August 2016.

After a stint with former club La Nucía in the fourth tier, Morgado moved abroad for the first time in his career and joined Indian Super League club Jamshedpur FC on 10 August 2018. On 2 October, he made his debut, scoring in the dying minutes of a 2–0 victory against Mumbai City FC.

Club statistics

References

External links

1989 births
Living people
Footballers from Valencia (city)
Spanish footballers
Association football forwards
Segunda División B players
Tercera División players
Valencia CF Mestalla footballers
CF La Nucía players
CD Mirandés footballers
Huracán Valencia CF players
CE L'Hospitalet players
CF Badalona players
Mérida AD players
FC Jumilla players
Indian Super League players
Jamshedpur FC players
Spanish expatriate footballers
Expatriate footballers in India
Spanish expatriate sportspeople in India